Yanachkov is a surname. Notable people with the surname include:

Ivaylo Yanachkov (born 1986), Bulgarian footballer
Nikola Yanachkov (born 1993), Bulgarian footballer

Bulgarian-language surnames